Micronia is a genus of moths of subfamily Microniinae of family Uraniidae. The genus was erected by Achille Guenée in 1857. The species of this genus are found in India, Sri Lanka, Indonesia and Papua New Guinea.

Description 
Palpi porrect (extending forward), slender, and rather long. Antennae thickened and flattened. Hindleg of male with the femur very slender, the tibiae thickened, with one medial spur and a terminal pair; a tuft of short hair from the base on upperside. Forewing with the costa arched towards apex, which is acute; the outer margin straight; veins 2 and 3 on a short stalk; 6 and 7 from angle of cell; 8, 9 and 10 stalked. Hindwing with an angle at vein 4; veins 3 and 4 from cell.

Species
Micronia aculeata Guenée, 1857
Micronia albidiorata Mabille, 1893
Micronia dilatistriga Warren
Micronia discata Warren
Micronia falca Swinhoe
Micronia fuscifimbria Warren
Micronia interrupta Pagenstecher
Micronia justaria Walker
Micronia notabalis Pagenstecher, 1900
Micronia obliterata Warren
Micronia pluviosa Warren, 1897
Micronia punctatissima Gaede, 1929
Micronia semifasciata Mabille, 1879
Micronia sinuosa Warren
Micronia strigifera Warren
Micronia thibetaria Poujade, 1895
Micronia zebrata Warren

References 

Uraniidae